Calliptamus wattenwylianus is a species of short-horned grasshopper in the family Acrididae. It is found in Europe and North Africa.

Subspecies
These two subspecies belong to the species Calliptamus wattenwylianus:
 Calliptamus wattenwylianus okbaensis Kheil, 1915
 Calliptamus wattenwylianus wattenwylianus Pantel, 1896

References

External links

 

Acrididae